The 1936 New Year Honours in New Zealand were appointments by King George V to various orders and honours to reward and highlight good works by New Zealanders. The awards celebrated the passing of 1935 and the beginning of 1936, and were announced on 1 January 1936.

The recipients of honours are displayed here as they were styled before their new honour.

Knight Bachelor
 James Hutchison – of Dunedin. For public services.

Order of Saint Michael and Saint George

Companion (CMG)
 Willi Fels – of Dunedin. For services to ethnology.
 Cecil Albert Jeffery – of Wellington; clerk of the Executive Council and secretary to the Cabinet.

Order of the British Empire

Knight Commander (KBE)
Civil division
 George Shirtcliffe  – of Wellington. For public services.

Commander (CBE)
Civil division
 Charles John McKenzie – of Wellington; engineer-in-chief and under-secretary, Public Works Department.

Officer (OBE)
Civil division
 Maude Elizabeth Parkes – of Auckland. For social and philanthropic services.
 Ann Gilchrist Strong – of Dunedin; dean of the Home Science Department, University of Otago.

References

New Year Honours
1936 awards
1936 in New Zealand
New Zealand awards